Siloam Springs Lake, also known as City Lake, is located about 3 miles north of central Siloam Springs in Benton County, Arkansas.  It is fed by Flint Creek, a stream that forms around Springtown, Arkansas and flows generally southwest into Oklahoma.  The creek eventually flows into the Illinois River.   Normally the creek is crystal clear and flows year-round.

Popular fish caught in Siloam Springs Lake include carp, rock bass, sunfish, catfish, yellow bass, largemouth bass and bream/bluegill.

The lake is owned by the City of Siloam Springs.  It is part of the 165-acre City Lake Park.  The master plan for the park, approved in December 2016, includes stacked loops of walking and cycling trails over a variety of topography and ecological systems.

References

Lakes of Arkansas
Illinois River (Oklahoma)
Geography of Benton County, Arkansas